Backward invention is a product strategy in international marketing in which an existing product may have to be re-engineered or dumbed down by the company to be released in Less Developed Countries, often at a cheaper rate.

Doing so can often breathe new life into an obsolete product by the company or even target people too poor to afford the actual product.

Definition
There are two definitions for a backward invention:
 "Reintroducing earlier product forms that can be well adapted to a foreign country’s needs."
 "Redesigning and producing a product for specific foreign markets after it is obsolete in industrialized countries."

Examples
The National Cash Register Company reintroduced a dumbed down version of its crank-operated cash register at a lower cost for South American and African markets.

Another example would be of the German book-publishing giant Bertelsmann in Ukraine, where the average person's salary is less and bookstores are hard to find.  The old-fashioned book club is enjoying huge popularity there, whereas it has seen a decline in its Book-of-the-Month and Literary Guild units in both the United States and Europe. In Ukraine, however, these clubs are seeing profit margins triple the 4% global average. Bertelsmann also finds that these clubs draw a younger following than in the United States. The publisher also keeps prices low because its main competitor in Ukraine is the open air book market, where books sell very cheaply.

Advantages
  Increase in revenue due to increase in sales.
  Wider reach and brand awareness and brand popularity in newer markets.
  Breathe new life into an obsolete product by the company (Cycle-recycle pattern of the product life cycle)
  Appeal to the lower segment of the socio-economic audience.

See also
 Invention

References

Product management